LinLyn Lue is a Canadian actress.

Early life 
Lue was born in Jamaica and came to Canada with her family as a child.

Career 
Lue played the strict English teacher Ms. Kwan on the Canadian television show Degrassi: The Next Generation for nine seasons. She also appeared in the films Black Robe, Blindness, Total Recall and the television series Strong Medicine and Doc.

Filmography

Film

Television

References

External links

Year of birth missing (living people)
Canadian film actresses
Canadian television actresses
Jamaican emigrants to Canada
Living people
Place of birth missing (living people)
Canadian actresses of Chinese descent
Jamaican people of Chinese descent